"More Than Words" is a song by American rock band Extreme, released as the fifth track and third single from their second album, Pornograffitti (1990), in March 1991. It is a ballad built around acoustic guitar work by Nuno Bettencourt and the vocals of Gary Cherone (with harmony vocals from Bettencourt). The song is a detour from the funk metal style that permeates the band's records. As such, it has often been described as "a blessing and a curse" due to its overwhelming success and recognition worldwide, but the band ultimately embraced it and plays it at every show.

Content
The song is a ballad in which the singer wants his lover to do more to prove her love other than saying the phrase "I love you." Bettencourt described it as a warning that the phrase was becoming meaningless: "People use it so easily and so lightly that they think you can say that and fix everything, or you can say that and everything's OK. Sometimes you have to do more and you have to show it—there's other ways to say 'I love you.'" 

"That song gave us the freedom to make the record we really wanted to make when we started recording our third disc," Cherone told KNAC. "It got us doing huge tours all over the states and around the world... As the nineties went on, however, we really started to resent the song. We were tagged 'the More Than Words guys'. We didn't like the perception the song created about the band. I remember being on tour with Aerosmith in Poland... it was on that tour we decided we would not play the song. We just didn't do it. A couple nights into the tour, Steven Tyler writes in big letters on our dressing room door, 'Play the fucking song!' His attitude was almost father-like. He was like, 'Look, this is your first time in Poland. When do you think you will be back? They want to hear it, so play it!'"

Critical reception
AllMusic editor William Ruhlmann noted that on the song, the band pursued "acoustic balladry". Kira L. Billik from Associated Press described it as a "sweet, pure acoustic ballad" "whose message is that the words "I love you" are becoming meaningless." It was also labeled as a "nontraditional love song". 

Billboard stated that this "tender, sparsely produced rock/love ballad proves that sometimes less really is more. The spotlight here is on the band's striking vocal harmonies, as well as its shimmering acoustic guitar work." The Daily Vault's Sean McCarthy said that it is a "beautiful, minimal acoustic number [that] made the band huge" and added that "for the band, "More Than Words" is the song that will still get airplay." 

Diane Cardwell from Entertainment Weekly called it "a simple, almost folkie ballad using just two voices and a single acoustic guitar." Kirsten Frickle from El Paisano described it as an "all-acoustic ballad that is so beautiful it will make your hair stand on end". 

Pan-European magazine Music & Media labeled the song as "folky" and "a calming piece of music, aptly produced by Michael Wagener." They added, "It shows the band from a totally different angle. And it must be said, they handle this ballad extremely well." 

Alan Jones from Music Week stated that it is "a subdued, lilting acoustic workout that suggests nothing more than Simon & Garfunkel in its more angelic passages." Carrie Borzillo from Record-Journal called it an "Everly Brothers-style" song. 

A reviewer from Sandwell Evening Mail wrote, "If ever a song could be unrepresentative of a band's output, Extreme's worldwide smash hit ballad More Than Words is it." Marc Andrews from Smash Hits said it is "eye-moistening". 

Tom Nordlie from Spin noted it as "a love ballad that sounds like the Everly Brothers or early Beatles." He added, "Singer Gary Cherone harmonizes with himself as guitar-friend Nuno Bettencourt strums clean, jazzy chord accompaniment, and that's it. No sudden escalation to bombast in the middle, no reneging on the song's original promise."

Chad Bowar writing for LiveAbout placed the song on his list of the "Best 20 Hair Metal Ballads of the '80s and '90s".

Chart performance
On March 23, 1991, "More Than Words" entered the US Billboard Hot 100 at number 81 and soon after reached number one. It also reached number two in the United Kingdom, where the group had success before its American breakthrough. Though they had made a few European charts before, this brought the band to their first mainstream success in the United States.

Music video
The song's music video was filmed in black and white and was produced and directed by Jonathan Dayton and Valerie Faris. It starts with Pat Badger turning off his amplifier and putting down his bass, and Paul Geary putting down his drumsticks. Nuno and Gary are then seen performing the song, while the other band members are shown in front of them, holding up their lighters.

In the video's music rendition, the song ends abruptly before Nuno's final solo and coda.

Track listings
CD maxi
 "More Than Words" — 5:33
 "Kid Ego" — 4:04
 "Nice Place to Visit" — 3:16

7-inch single
 "More Than Words" (Remix) — 3:43
 "Nice Place to Visit" — 3:16

Charts

Weekly charts

Year-end charts

Decade-end charts

Certifications

Release history

References

1990 songs
1990s ballads
1991 singles
2002 singles
A&M Records singles
American soft rock songs
Billboard Hot 100 number-one singles
Black-and-white music videos
Cashbox number-one singles
Dutch Top 40 number-one singles
Extreme (band) songs
Glam metal ballads
Frankie J songs
Music videos directed by Jonathan Dayton and Valerie Faris
Number-one singles in New Zealand
Rock ballads
RPM Top Singles number-one singles
Songs written by Gary Cherone
Songs written by Nuno Bettencourt
Sony BMG singles